includes various written marks (besides characters and numbers), which differ from those found in European languages, as well as some not used in formal Japanese writing but frequently found in more casual writing, such as exclamation and question marks.

Japanese can be written horizontally or vertically, and some punctuation marks adapt to this change in direction. Parentheses, curved brackets, square quotation marks, ellipses, dashes, and swung dashes are rotated clockwise 90° when used in vertical text (see diagram).

Japanese punctuation marks are usually full width (that is, occupying an area that is the same as the surrounding characters).

Punctuation was not widely used in Japanese writing until translations from European languages became common in the 19th century.

Japanese punctuation marks

Brackets

As in English, brackets are used in pairs to set apart or interject text within other text. When writing vertically, brackets are rotated clockwise ninety degrees. Each bracket occupies its own square when using genkō yōshi.

Braces

｛　｝

Parentheses

（　）

Square brackets

［　］

Lenticular brackets
【　】

, also known as lenticular brackets. Lenticular brackets are also used as quotation marks in the Japanese language.

Comma

The  is used in many contexts, principally for marking off separate elements within a sentence. In horizontal writing, the comma is placed at the bottom right of the preceding character. In vertical writing, it is placed immediately below and to the right of the last character, in a separate square if using genkō yōshi. In horizontally written manuscripts that contain a mixture of Japanese and Western characters, the full-width comma may be incorporated as well. No extra space is left after a comma.

Double hyphen

It may act in two ways:
 Primarily, it is used to represent a hyphen (-), due to potential confusion with the prolonged sound mark. For example, "Jean-Jacques Rousseau" is written "", and "Catherine Zeta-Jones" is written "". Occasionally, the hyphen too may be represented as an interpunct (・), in which case no distinction is made between hyphens and spaces.
 Although far more rarely, it can be observed in identical use to the interpunct. In that case, "Sir Arthur Conan Doyle" may, for example, be written "".

Ellipsis

Ellipses ( rīdā (leaders),  tensen (dotted line), or  ten-ten ("dot dot") indicate an intentional omission or abbreviation, or a pause in speech, an unfinished thought or, at the end of a sentence, a trailing off into silence (aposiopesis). Ellipsis was adopted into Japanese from European languages.

The ellipsis is often three dots or six dots (in two groups of three dots), though variations in number of dots exist. The dots can be either on the baseline or centred between the baseline and the ascender when horizontal; the dots are centred horizontally when vertical.

Other uses:

 As a substitute for dashes
 In manga and visual novels, the ellipsis by itself often represents speechlessness or a "pregnant pause"

Full stop

The  is a small circle.  In horizontal writing, the full stop is placed in the same position as it would be in English, that is, at the bottom right of the preceding character. In vertical writing, it is placed immediately below and to the right of the last character, in a separate square if using genkō yōshi. (Note the difference in placement with the traditional Chinese full stop, which is placed in the centre of the square.)

Unlike the Western full stop, it is often used to separate consecutive sentences, rather than to finish every sentence; it is frequently left out where a sentence stands alone. No extra space is used after a full stop.

In manuscripts that contain a mixture of Japanese and Western characters, the Western full stop may be incorporated as well.

Words containing full stops

Starting in the 1980s, advertising copy writers began incorporating full stops in titles and other advertising. In the 1990s, the group  began using a full stop in its name, starting a fad for this usage. Other examples include the following:

 , a manga by Shin Takahashi.
 , a Japanese pop group from Hello! Project.
 , a drama series (dorama), produced and aired in 2005 by NTV.
 , a 2016 Japanese animated romantic drama film written and directed by Makoto Shinkai.

Interpunct

The  or "katakana middle dot" (as the Unicode consortium calls it) is a small dot used for interword separation. It is also known as nakapochi, nakapotsu and nakaten. It has a fixed width that is the same as most kana characters.

Uses include:

 Separating Japanese words where the intended meaning would be unclear if the characters were written side-by-side
 To separate listed items, instead of a comma:  (elementary and middle school) versus 
 To separate foreign words and names when written in kana:  (personal computer), and occasionally for Japanese names, particularly when there would otherwise be confusion as to where one name ends and another begins (in creative writing, especially manga and light novels when transcribing proper nouns, there's a fad of replacing the interpunct with an equal sign, a white star or any other "fitting" symbol)
 As a substitute for a double hyphen
 To separate titles, names and positions:  (Assistant Department Head Suzuki)
 As a decimal point when writing numbers in kanji:  (3.14)
 In place of hyphens, dashes and colons when writing vertically

Part alternation mark

The part alternation mark  ( ioriten or  utakigō) is used to indicate the beginning of a song, or the beginning of the next player's part.

It was most common in Noh chanting books and Renga (linked verse). In Noh books it is used to mark the beginning of each character's (or the chorus') parts. The opening square quotation mark may also be used.

Quotation marks

Single quotation marks

「　」

Double quotation marks

『　』
〝　〟

 are used to mark quotes within quotes:  as well as to mark book titles (Japanese does not have italic type, and does not use sloping type for this purpose in Japanese).  They are also sometimes used in fiction to denote text that is heard through a telephone or other device.

Space

A space is any empty (non-written) zone between written sections. A Japanese space is the same width as a CJK character and is thus also called an "ideographic space".

In English, spaces are used for interword separation as well as separation between punctuation and words. In normal Japanese writing, no spaces are left between words, except if the writing is exclusively in hiragana or katakana (or with little or no kanji), in which case spaces may be required to avoid confusion.

In Japanese, a single space is often left before the first character in a new paragraph, especially when writing on genkō yōshi (manuscript paper), and a space is left after non-Japanese punctuation marks (such as exclamation points and question marks). A space may be left between the family and given names as well. When the character is not easily available, a direct HTML equivalent is the &emsp; entity (em-space) which outputs the same fullwidth " " glyph.

A fullwidth space may be used where a colon or comma would be used in English:  (Yamato Bank, Osaka Branch).

Wave dash

The  resembles a lengthened tilde (FULLWIDTH TILDE), which does not exist in JIS X 0208.

Uses in Japanese include:

 To indicate ranges (from 5 o'clock to 6 o'clock;  Tokyo to Osaka). In such cases it may be read as ...kara...made
 To separate a title from a subtitle on the same line; in English a colon is used for this purpose.
 To mark subtitles: 
 In pairs, in place of dashes or brackets: 
 To indicate origin:  (from France)
 To indicate a long or drawn-out vowel, usually for comic or cute effect
 To indicate or suggest that music is playing: 
 To suggest a ruled line:  or

Other punctuation marks in common use

The Japanese versions of these punctuation marks are usually full-width characters. A full-width space is usually left after such marks when writing in Japanese.

Colon

 ： 

The  consists of two equally sized dots centered on the same vertical line. As a rule, a colon informs the reader that what follows proves, clarifies, explains, or simply enumerates elements of what is referred to before. Although not a native Japanese punctuation mark, the colon is sometimes used, especially in academic writing.

Exclamation mark

 ！ 

The , also colloquially called the びっくりマーク (bikkuri māku, lit. "surprise mark") is usually used after an interjection or exclamation to indicate strong feelings or high volume, and generally marks the end of a sentence. A sentence ending in an exclamation mark is either an actual exclamation ("Wow!", "Boo!"), a command ("Stop!"), or is intended to be astonishing in some way ("They were the footprints of a gigantic hound!").

While there is no exclamation point in formal Japanese, it is very commonly used, especially in casual writing, fiction and manga.

Question mark

 ？ 

In formal Japanese, no particular symbol is used to mark interrogative sentences, which end with the normal Japanese full stop. However, the question mark is very commonly used, especially in casual and creative writing and in manga.

Musical note

 ♪ 

This sign is added to the tail of a phrase, indicating it is a part of lyrics or someone is singing the phrase. 
example:

See also

 Iteration mark
 Japanese typographic symbols
 East Asian punctuation, notably:
 Chinese punctuation, which uses a similar set of symbols but with some differences.

References

Japanese orthography
Japanese writing system
Punctuation of specific languages